Kateryna Oleksandrivna Tabashnyk (born 15 June 1994) is a Ukrainian high jumper who formerly competed in the heptathlon.

Career
She did not finish the heptathlon at the 2012 World Junior Championships. She has since recorded no heptathlon results on an international level.

She competed in high jump without reaching the final at the 2011 World Youth Championships and the 2013 European Indoor Championships. She then won the gold medal at the 2013 European Junior Championships.

Her personal best high jump is 1.99 metres, achieved indoors on 26 January 2019 in Hustopeče, Czech Republic.

On 28 March 2019 in Antalya (Turkey) she tested positive for Hydrochlorothiazide, a Prohibited Substance under the WADA 2019. On 13 January 2020 the Athletics Integrity Unit disqualified her for 19 months from March 28, 2019.

Family 
On 18 August 2022 as a result of shelling of Kharkiv by the Russian Armed Forces Kateryna's mother was killed.

References

1994 births
Living people
Sportspeople from Kharkiv
Ukrainian female high jumpers
Ukrainian heptathletes
21st-century Ukrainian women